In the Heights is a 2021 American musical drama film directed by Jon M. Chu from a screenplay by Quiara Alegría Hudes based on the stage musical of the same name by Hudes and Lin-Manuel Miranda. The film stars Anthony Ramos, Corey Hawkins, Leslie Grace in her film debut, Melissa Barrera, Olga Merediz, Daphne Rubin-Vega, Gregory Diaz IV, and Jimmy Smits. The film follows a similar plot to the musical, telling the story of a corner in the predominantly Dominican Washington Heights neighborhood of Upper Manhattan in New York City, where every member of the community pursues their  (little dreams) for a better life.

In the Heights was originally set to be adapted by Universal Pictures in 2008, with Kenny Ortega hired to direct. After that version fell through, the project was eventually started back up in 2016, with Chu set to direct and Ramos being cast in October 2018. The rest of the cast joined in April 2019, and filming took place around New York City that summer.

Originally intended to be released in 2020, In the Heights was postponed due to the COVID-19 pandemic. The film had its world premiere at the Los Angeles Latino International Film Festival on June 4, 2021, and was released in the United States on June 10 in theaters and streaming on HBO Max under a 30-day simultaneous exhibition window. It was widely praised for Chu's direction, the performances, and musical numbers, though a box-office bomb, grossing just $45 million against its $55 million production budget and $200 million break-even point. For his performance in the film, Ramos was nominated for a Golden Globe Award in the category Best Actor – Motion Picture Musical or Comedy.

Plot 

Usnavi de la Vega tells a group of children a story of Washington Heights. Ten years earlier, Usnavi is the owner of a bodega in the neighborhood. After chasing off street artist "Graffiti Pete", he introduces:  Claudia, the neighborhood matriarch who raised him; Kevin Rosario, who runs a taxi company; Benny, Kevin's employee and Usnavi’s best friend; the beauty salon ladies Daniela, Carla, and Cuca; Sonny, Usnavi’s teenage cousin; and Vanessa, on whom Usnavi has a crush ("In The Heights").

Alejandro, an attorney and family friend, informs Usnavi that his late father's business in the Dominican Republic, which he dreams of reviving, is for sale. Kevin's daughter Nina returns from Stanford University. After seeing Benny ("Benny's Dispatch"), she tells her father she cannot afford tuition, but he brushes her off, telling her not to worry ("Breathe").

Nina visits Daniela's salon, which is moving to the Bronx due to rising rents in Manhattan, where she reconnects with the ladies but reveals she has dropped out of Stanford (""). Vanessa submits a rental application downtown, where she dreams of becoming a fashion designer, but is rejected ("It Won't Be Long Now"). She heads to the bodega, where Sonny asks her out for Usnavi.

Sonny learns a lottery ticket the bodega sold has won $96,000. At the public pool, everybody in the neighborhood fantasizes about what they would do with the money ("96,000"), while the local  laments losing business to a Mister Softee truck (""). Reminiscing about their childhood, Benny reassures Nina she is destined for greatness ("When You're Home"). Usnavi talks to Sonny's father about letting Sonny come with him to the Dominican Republic, but Sonny's father implies he and Sonny are illegal immigrants and cannot leave.

Kevin reveals he has sold his business to pay for Nina's tuition, but she refuses the money, revealing the real reason she dropped out was the racism she experienced. Usnavi and Vanessa head to the salsa club for their date, but he is too nervous to dance with her. After multiple men dance with Vanessa, Usnavi tries to make her jealous by dancing with another woman ("The Club"). The power goes out, and Sonny and Graffiti Pete illuminate the neighborhood with fireworks. Vanessa and Usnavi argue, and she rejects him ("Blackout").

She dies peacefully, and the neighborhood comes together to mourn (""). At a protest for DACA, Sonny learns that he cannot go to college as an undocumented immigrant. Nina resolves to return to Stanford to find a pathway in life for undocumented children.

Finding Vanessa's rental application in the trash, Usnavi asks Daniela to co-sign. Disappointed with the block's negativity over the power outage and 's death, Daniela rouses the neighborhood into a celebration (""), as the power outage ends. Vanessa and Usnavi reconcile.

A month later, Nina is returning to Stanford. Benny promises to join her in Palo Alto, and they kiss ("When the Sun Goes Down"). As Usnavi prepares to leave for the Dominican Republic, he discovers that  held the winning lottery ticket, and has left it to him. Vanessa arrives with champagne, having learned about Usnavi’s help with her new lease. She suggests Usnavi stay but he refuses, and she kisses him, lamenting that she was too late in realizing her feelings for him ("Champagne").

Usnavi gives Alejandro the lottery ticket to use for Sonny's DACA fees. The next morning, Vanessa takes Usnavi to the bodega and shows him a fashion line she created the previous night inspired by Graffiti Pete's work. Seeing Pete's murals celebrating Abuela, Usnavi decides to stay. The story returns to the present day, revealing that Usnavi is telling his story in the remodeled bodega to his and Vanessa's daughter, Iris. Everyone sings and dances in the street, while Usnavi expresses his elation at being in Washington Heights, where he has always belonged (“Finale”).

Cast 

In addition, Lin-Manuel Miranda, who wrote the music and lyrics of the original musical and played Usnavi in the original Broadway run, appears as the piragüero, who keeps having run ins with the Mr. Softee Truck Driver, portrayed by Christopher Jackson, who originated the Benny character through to the original Broadway run. Olga Merediz also reprises her role as  Claudia.

The film includes contributions by original Broadway cast members, such as cameos by Seth Stewart and Javier Muñoz, as well as background vocals by Andréa Burns, Janet Dacal, Mandy Gonzalez, Joshua Henry, Krysta Rodriguez, and Jon Rua. Broadway actor Patrick Page appears as Pike Phillips. Miranda's parents Luis Miranda and Luz Towns-Miranda make cameo appearances during "Breathe". Also in the song "Breathe", actress Ariana Greenblatt makes an appearance as the character of young Nina. The Kid Mero provides the voice of the DJ at the start of the film. Valentina appears as a patron of Daniela's salon. NPR journalist Maria Hinojosa appears as the protest leader at the DACA rally. The film also features an appearance from Rennie Harris.

Production

Development

On November 7, 2008, Universal Pictures announced that they planned to adapt the original musical as a feature film for release in 2011. Kenny Ortega was set to direct the film, which was slated to begin filming in summer 2011 with a budget of $37 million. However, the project was canceled in March 2011; reportedly, this was due to the fact Universal was looking for a "bankable Latino star" like Shakira or Jennifer Lopez instead of unknown actors. In January 2012, Lin-Manuel Miranda stated that the film adaptation was back under discussion; in the meantime, he went on vacation and started to read a biography of Alexander Hamilton, which would lead to his next project, Hamilton. In May 2016, it was announced that Miranda would co-produce the film with Harvey Weinstein and backing from The Weinstein Company. On June 10, 2016, Jon M. Chu came on board to direct the film adaptation of the musical. In the aftermath of numerous sexual misconduct allegations made against Weinstein, his producer credit on the film was removed, with the rights to the film eventually auctioned off to Warner Bros. for $50 million. Warner Bros. was one of several studios wanting to produce In the Heights—due to the success of Hamilton; to persuade Miranda and Chu, they built a backlot bodega with  carts and set up performances of songs from the show. The budget was set at $55 million.

Casting
In October 2018, Anthony Ramos was cast in an undisclosed role, later revealed to be the lead of Usnavi. Miranda, who played the role in the Broadway production, watched Ramos play the part in the 2018 Kennedy Center production and praised him on Twitter. In January 2019, Corey Hawkins was cast in the role of Benny. In April 2019, Jimmy Smits, Melissa Barrera, Leslie Grace, Olga Merediz, Gregory Diaz, Daphne Rubin-Vega, Stephanie Beatriz and Dascha Polanco were cast. Miranda revealed in an interview on The Tonight Show that he initially did not plan on appearing in the film at all, having decided he was too old to play Usnavi during development. He relented when Hudes threatened to cut the song "" unless he played the role.

Filming
Filming began on June 3, 2019, in New York City. The bulk of filming was done at the intersection of 175th Street and Audubon Avenue, where STO Domingo Grocery Inc. was used as the exterior of the bodega. The musical number "96,000" was filmed at the Highbridge Pool featuring synchronized swimming and shot over two days with 500 extras. Christopher Scott, who had worked with Jon M. Chu on the YouTube series The LXD as well as the films Step Up Revolution and Step Up All In, served as choreographer. "" was shot in the abandoned lower level of the Brooklyn Ninth Avenue station, which had previously been used in the film Joker (the "Joker Stairs" were also used as a filming location). The team had wanted to film the sequence inside the New York Transit Museum but could not as they were only allowed to use the space for the one day the museum is closed to the public. However, they were able to rent vintage subway cars from the museum for use in the number. The tunnel sequence at the end of the song was shot in the pedestrian tunnel at the 191st Street station. As the tunnel is a public access point for the station, the team was only given permission to close it for filming at night. The lights, which were rigged during the day while the tunnel was open, were initially designed to display a rainbow of light, but at the last second Chu had them changed to red, white, and blue – the colors of the Cuban, Puerto Rican, and American flags.

The vocal performances in the film are a mix of the actors singing live on-set, pre-recorded audio, and re-recorded in the studio during post-production. The production team's choice to use one or the others depended on the environment of the scene and tone of the song. Usnavi and Vanessa's duet, "Champagne", which is one continuous shot, was recorded entirely on-set.

The film is dedicated to the memory of Doreen Montalvo, a member of the original Broadway cast who appears in the film as one of the singers during "Breathe" and reprises her role as the Bolero singer performing "". Montalvo died in October 2020, after the film's postponed release date.

Differences from the musical
Several changes were made from the musical, which first ran in 2005, such as adding references to the Deferred Action for Childhood Arrivals (DACA) immigration policy and microaggressions, and cutting certain characters and songs.
 The most significant of these cut characters is Camila Rosario, Nina's mother, who is still alive in the musical: Hudes cited a desire to focus on two specific matriarchs in the community, Abuela Claudia and Daniela.
 In the musical, Nina loses her scholarship to Stanford after her grades dropped from taking extra jobs to support her family. This influences her decision to drop out. In the film she drops out due to a combination of experiencing racism and her guilt over her father's sacrifices in order for her to attend college.
 "" was originally placed after "96,000" and ended with the reveal that  Claudia bought the winning lottery ticket. This is the impetus for Usnavi's impending move to the Dominican Republic. In the film, Usnavi and the audience do not learn about this until towards the climax, and a new backstory of Usnavi buying his father's old store in the Dominican Republic is given as the reason for his desire to move. Alongside that, "" was placed before "".
 A majority of Nina and Benny's relationship is different from the musical: a major source of conflict in the stage version is Kevin's disapproval of Benny dating Nina due to not being Latino. This conflict is absent in the film, with the implication that Benny and Nina dated prior to her moving away.
 Vanessa and Usnavi's romance was recentered as the film's focus, as opposed to the musical's focus on Benny and Nina. Notably, Benny and Nina's argument from the musical's version of "The Club" and "Blackout" is given to Vanessa and Usnavi.
 As a result of these changes, "," "Sunrise," "Hundreds of Stories," "Enough," "", and "Everything I Know" were cut from the film.
 In the musical,  Claudia's death occurs after "", a few days into the blackout. In the film she dies only a few hours into the blackout.
 A reference to Donald Trump in "96,000" was changed to Tiger Woods.
 Sonny's status as an undocumented immigrant is new to the film.
 Alejandro, Cuca, and Gapo de la Vega were created for the film.
 Daniela and Carla are scripted and played as being in a romantic relationship. This is new to the film, as their relationship appears to be purely platonic in the musical.
 During "Benny's Dispatch", a reference to Manny Ramirez was changed to Big Papi.
 With "Everything I Know" being absent from the film, Nina's reason for returning to college was changed to fighting for undocumented immigrants after realizing that Sonny may never go to college due to his status.
 In the film, there is no fight at the club, and Usnavi's store is not ransacked during the blackout as it is in the musical.
 In the musical, Vanessa wants to move out of Washington Heights to get away from her mother. In the film, she appears to live alone and wishes to move downtown to pursue her fashion design dreams.
 The musical version of "It Won't Be Long Now" includes a bridge where Usnavi and Sonny say good morning and dance with Vanessa, only to be interrupted by Daniella telling her to buy a drink. This bridge was filmed but cut, and would have been sung by people Vanessa passes on the street in a choreographed sequence, shortly before she enters the bodega. Footage of the sequence shot by a bystander was later leaked online.
 In the film, Usnavi is telling the story to a group of children seemingly on a beach (which is shown to actually be the bodega at the end of the film). In the musical, Usnavi is just narrating the story to the audience. 
While the musical does mention these things, the focus is more on a theme of community and never forgetting your roots and where you came from.

Music 

The film's soundtrack album was released by Atlantic Records and WaterTower Music on June 10, 2021, the same day as its U.S. release. The songs are composed and written by Lin-Manuel Miranda, who produced the tracks with Alex Lacamoire, Bill Sherman and Greg Wells. Two singles  the title track was released on the album's pre-order date on April 23, 2021, and "96,000" was released via streaming on May 3, 2021, prior to the album's release date.

Two songs created for the film but not included on the soundtrack are "Always", a doo-wop version of "Siempre" performed by Mandy Gonzalez, who originated the role of Nina on Broadway, in the background of the dry cleaners scene, and "Cuándo Llega El Tren", performed by Bronx musician Flaco Navaja, which plays in the background of the bodega when Sonny helps Usnavi ask Vanessa out. Both songs feature backing vocals by Miranda, Lacamoire, and Sherman. In addition, a hold music version of "You'll Be Back" from Hamilton plays as an easter egg during the scene where Kevin Rosario calls Stanford University. Despite its inclusion in the film's post-credit scene, "Piragua (Reprise)" is not on the soundtrack album.

Release

Theatrical and streaming
In the Heights was first screened virtually for critics on April 15, 2021. It had its world premiere at the Tribeca Film Festival in New York City on June 9, 2021, following an advanced screening at the Los Angeles Latino International Film Festival on June 4, 2021 at the TCL Chinese Theater in Hollywood. It was released in the United States on June 10, 2021, in both theaters and on HBO Max.

It was previously scheduled to be released on June 26, 2020, but it was delayed to June 18, 2021, due to the COVID-19 pandemic, before being moved up a week to June 11, and finally one day earlier to June 10. On May 9, 2021, select Cinemark, Regal Cinemas and AMC theaters hosted a free advance screening in honor of Mother's Day. Internationally, the film was released in the United Kingdom on June 18, 2021. Other markets like European and Australasian countries have scheduled dates planned for between July and September 2021.

Home media
In the Heights was released on digital platforms on July 30, 2021 with the DVD, Blu-ray, and 4K UHD releases from Warner Bros. Home Entertainment arriving a month later on August 30, 2021. The film returned to HBO Max on October 28.

Reception

Box office 
 In the Heights has grossed $30 million in the United States and Canada, and $15.2 million in other territories, for a worldwide total of $45.2 million. Due to its $55 million production budget and another $50 million spent on marketing, Variety estimated the film would need to gross around $200 million worldwide in order to break-even.

In the United States and Canada, In the Heights was released alongside Peter Rabbit 2: The Runaway and The House Next Door: Meet the Blacks 2 and was initially projected to gross as high as $25–35 million from 3,456 theaters in its opening weekend, though an estimate of $10 million to the midteens was also suggested. A poll by Fandango Media found that the film would be the first seen in a theater since the pandemic began for 96% of people pre-ordering tickets for it. After grossing $5 million on its first day, weekend estimates were lowered to $13 million. It went on to debut to just $11.5 million, finishing second behind holdover A Quiet Place Part II. 67% of the audience was over the age of 25, with 63% being female; 40% of the opening weekend audience was Latino. 

While some analysts, such as Anthony D'Alessandro for Deadline Hollywood, suggested that the film's underperformance could be partially blamed on its simultaneous release on HBO Max, Rebecca Rubin posited in Variety that it could be attributed to alternative factors, such as the film's 143-minute runtime reducing the number of individual screenings per day, 25% of American theaters remaining closed at the time of release (and many theaters which had opened limiting audiences due to social distancing measures), and the film's source material and lead cast members having relatively low name recognition, and its release on HBO Max. The film fell 60% in its second weekend, grossing $4.5 million and finishing in sixth.

Streaming viewership 
According to Samba TV, the film was streamed on HBO Max by 693,000 households over its first three days of release, lower than previous day-in-date Warner Bros. titles like Mortal Kombat (3.8 million) and The Conjuring: The Devil Made Me Do It (1.6 million). Research firm Screen Engine reported the film was the third-most streamed film across all platforms in its opening weekend behind Mortal Kombat (which was available via PVOD) and Awake. By the end of its first month, the film had been streamed in over 1.7 million U.S. households.

Critical response 
The website's critics consensus reads, "Lights up for In the Heights, a joyous celebration of heritage and community fueled by dazzling direction and singalong songs." On Metacritic, the film has a weighted average score of 84 out of 100 based on 55 critics, indicating "universal acclaim". Audiences polled by CinemaScore gave the film an average grade of "A" on an A+ to F scale, while PostTrak reported 88% of audience members gave it a positive score, with 67% saying they would definitely recommend it.

Monica Castillo of the TheWrap wrote: "Like Crazy Rich Asians, not everyone is going to feel represented when they watch In the Heights. That's an impossible task for any movie. Yet In the Heights can represent many things for many different viewers. It can be a story about ambitious, hard-working people chasing their dreams. It can be a reflection on the immigrant experience and the struggle to find where you belong. It can also be a tribute to our parents' sacrifices." From The Hollywood Reporter, David Rooney said: "The movie glows with an abundance of love for its characters, their milieu and the pride with which they defend their cultural footprint against the encroaching forces of New York development that continually shove the marginalized further into the margins. The resilience with which the characters claim their place in the fabric of city life is exhilarating."

In his review for Variety, Peter Debruge praised Chu's direction and wrote: "Like its source, the movie is a blast, one that benefits enormously from being shot on the streets of Washington Heights." IndieWires David Ehrlich gave the film an A−, saying: "So exuberant and full of life that it would probably convince you the movies were back even if they hadn't gone anywhere, In the Heights is the kind of electrifying theatrical experience that people have been waxing nostalgic about ever since the pandemic began — the kind that it almost seemed like we might never get to enjoy again... Seeing this massive, guileless, heartfelt piece of Hollywood entertainment on the big screen is like coming home after a long year in exile only to find that it's still there, and maybe even better than you remembered."

A. O. Scott of The New York Times gave the film a positive review, writing that "It’s a piece of mainstream American entertainment in the best sense — an assertion of impatience and faith, a celebration of communal ties and individual gumption, a testimony to the power of art to turn struggles into the stuff of dreams." From The A.V. Club, Danette Chavez wrote "In The Heights’ slice-of-life portraiture suggests a less ambitious undertaking than Hamilton, but it tells a story as expansive as that of a fledgling nation. Through both musicals, Miranda demonstrates how ingrained people of color are in this country’s history: Before he reimagined a pivotal chapter in United States history with Black and Latino actors, the acclaimed multi-hyphenate threw a spotlight on marginalized people's fight against displacement. At the core of In The Heights, on stage or screen, is movement—as migration, as immigration, as dancing, as code-switching, as the shift from friends to lovers."

There was slight criticism in terms of the changes to the character of Vanessa. In an article titled "The Generic  of In the Heights" from The New Yorker, author Frances Negrón-Muntaner states, "The choice to contain Vanessa implies that one does not need to flee downtown and escape one’s roots to succeed. That’s true enough, but in staying put Vanessa seems to give up her big dreams of crossing over, for man, child, and bodega." K. Austin Collins of Rolling Stone rated the film three and a half out of five stars. He praised the setting, music, and cast performances of the film, and also wrote that "In The Heights spins its lively, complicated tale. An aspirational immigrant story, but flows and overlaps and grows dense in unexpected ways. In both Miranda and Chu's trademark style, this is all threaded together with life spilling into the streets, musical numbers that fold reality into fantasy with an aplomb that's as pleasurable as it is overwhelming."

Accusations of colorism 
The film drew criticism for its casting choices, which seemingly excluded Afro-Latino actors with darker skin tones and misrepresented the demographics of Washington Heights, leading to accusations of colorism. Miranda issued an apology on social media regarding the matter shortly after the film's release. He also addressed the controversy during an appearance on The Daily Show, where he stressed that while "there's so much  in the movie, the beef really was specifically dark-skinned Afro-Latinos in leading roles... and I totally understand that and I receive it and I just have to do better on the next one." Lead actor Ramos also accepted the criticism, stating in an interview with the Associated Press that "there's no debate about it. You know you can't, right? Like there's nothing to debate".

Actress Rita Moreno defended Miranda during an interview on The Late Show with Stephen Colbert, saying: "It's like you can never do right, it seems... This is the man who literally has brought Latino-ness and Puerto Rican-ness to American [entertainment]". She added in reference to Miranda, "They're really attacking the wrong person." Moreno's comments received further backlash, with the National Association of Hispanic Journalists calling them "unacceptable". She subsequently issued a statement walking back on her remarks, stating in part, "I was clearly dismissive of Black lives that matter in our Latin community. It is so easy to forget how celebration for some is lament for others".

Accolades

See also 
 Dominican Americans
 Nuyorican
 Puerto Ricans in New York City

References

External links 
 
 

2021 films
2021 drama films
2020s musical drama films
American musical drama films
Films based on musicals
Films directed by Jon M. Chu
Films impacted by the COVID-19 pandemic
Films postponed due to the COVID-19 pandemic
Films produced by Lin-Manuel Miranda
Films scored by Lin-Manuel Miranda
Films set in Manhattan
Films shot in New York City
HBO Max films
Hispanic and Latino American drama films
IMAX films
Rap operas
Warner Bros. films
Race-related controversies in film
Casting controversies in film
2020s English-language films
2020s American films